Ilsea is a genus of moths of the family Erebidae. The genus was described by Schaus in 1906.

Species
Ilsea bormia Schaus, 1906
Ilsea dilucida Schaus, 1914
Ilsea minuta H. Druce, 1898
Ilsea subgeminata Schaus, 1914

References

Calpinae